Krzysztof Radwański  (born 26 May 1978 in Kraków) is a Polish defender who plays for Puszcza Niepołomice.

Career

Club
In December 2010, he joined Puszcza Niepołomice.

References

External links
 

1978 births
Living people
Wisła Kraków players
Proszowianka Proszowice players
MKS Cracovia (football) players
Górnik Łęczna players
Kolejarz Stróże players
Puszcza Niepołomice players
Polish footballers
Footballers from Kraków
Association football defenders